Sibora, also possibly called Foroba, was a town of ancient Pontus, inhabited in Roman and Byzantine times.

Its site is located near Karamağara, Asiatic Turkey.

References

Populated places in ancient Pontus
Former populated places in Turkey
Roman towns and cities in Turkey
Populated places of the Byzantine Empire
History of Yozgat Province